The First National Bank Building in Craig, Colorado was built in 1917.  It was listed on the National Register of Historic Places in 1997.

According to ColoradoHistory, "The two-story brick building was constructed in 1917 during the period of local economic optimism that followed the coming of the railroad in 1913.  It remains Craig’s most important example of early 20th century commercial architecture."

Carl Howelson, a famous Norwegian skijumper and mason, is believed to have laid the brickwork. A man named Charles R. Taylor is associated as either the architect or contractor.

References

Bank buildings on the National Register of Historic Places in Colorado
National Register of Historic Places in Moffat County, Colorado
Late 19th and Early 20th Century American Movements architecture
Early Commercial architecture in the United States
Buildings and structures completed in 1917
1917 establishments in Colorado